is a director of photography for many anime television and movie productions. There are small groups of fans of his many projects.

Projects
All credits are for director of photography unless otherwise noted.
Air (TV series)
Air (film)
Dr. Slump (TV and movie series)
Goldfish Warning! (movie)
GoShogun
Idol Densetsu Eriko
Idol Angel Yokoso Yoko
Legend of Heavenly Sphere Shurato
Magical Princess Minky Momo
Magical Tarurūto-kun (TV and movie series)
NG Knight Lamune & 40
Roku de Nashi Blues (movie series)
Make-Up! Sailor Senshi (special shown before the Sailor Moon R movie)
Saint Seiya Heaven Chapter ~ Overture (digital photography director)
Sei Jūshi Bismarck
Slam Dunk (TV and movie series)
Tokusō Kihei Dorvack
Yawara! A Fashionable Judo Girl (movie)

References

External links

 Japan Movie Database
 Goo Movies
 Allcinema Online

Anime directors
Japanese cinematographers
Living people
Year of birth missing (living people)